Khaidi is a 1983 Indian Telugu-language action film directed by A. Kodandarami Reddy. It stars Chiranjeevi and Madhavi. The film is loosely based on the 1982 American film First Blood. Released on 28 October 1983, the film was a massive commercial success and Chiranjeevi rose to stardom. In 1984, it was remade in Hindi as Qaidi, and in Kannada under the same title, with Madhavi reprising her role both times.

Plot 

Veerabhadraiah is a feudal lord presiding over a village along with his henchmen, which include his assistant and the village sarpanch. Veerabhadraiah lends money to Venkateswarlu, a local farmer living with his widowed daughter. His son Suryam is a hard working student living in the nearby city and he falls in love with Veerabhadraiah's daughter – Madhulatha. Realising this, Veerabhadraiah asks Venkateswarlu to ask his son to stop seeing his daughter, to which Venkateswarlu does not agree. Veerabhadraiah kills Venkateswarlu and asks Suryam to pay the money which he had given as a loan. Suryam asks for some time and with the help of his elder sister raises crops to repay. Just as the crops are ready for harvest, Veerabhadraiah and his henchmen not only destroy the crop but also try to sexually abuse Suryam's sister, during which she commits suicide. Being the village head, Veerabhadraiah implicates Suryam in the death of his sister, saying that he was forcing her into prostitution, due to which his sister committed suicide. Suryam is arrested by the Police. The rest of the movie deals with how Suryam escapes from jail and with the help of Sujatha, a doctor, he avenges the decimation of his family.

Cast 
 Chiranjeevi as Suryam
 Madhavi as Madhulatha
 Rao Gopal Rao as Veerabhadraiah
 Sumalatha as Sujatha
 Nutan Prasad as Munsiff
 Rallapalli as Sarma
 Ranganath as Police Inspector Dinesh
 Chalapathi Rao as Forest officer
 P. L. Narayana as  Venkateswarlu
 Chidathala Appa Rao as the barber
 Samyuktha as Rosy
 Sangeetha as Suryam's elder sister
 Suthivelu as Beggar
 Sivaprasad as Beggar

Production

Development 
The film presenter M. Tirupathi Reddy and director A. Kodandarami Reddy contemplated doing a film together with Chiranjeevi starring. Tirupathi Reddy asked the Paruchuri brothers to develop a story based on the American film First Blood (1982), and they did so; Kodandarami Reddy wrote the screenplay, and the Paruchuri brothers wrote the dialogues. In the original script, the protagonist was a villager, but in the final script he was written as a student. The title Khaidi was Tirupathi Reddy's choice. The film was produced by K. Dhanunjaya Reddy, S. Sudhakar Reddy and K. Narasa Reddy under Samyukta Movies, photographed by Lok Singh and edited by Kotagiri Venkateswara Rao.

Casting and filming 
Madhavi had never worked with Kodandarami Reddy before; as a result, Tirupathi Reddy decided to cast her as the lead actress of Khaidi. Tirupathi Reddy was impressed with actress Nitya's performance in a Tamil film, and cast her as the character Rosy; the actress was renamed Samyuktha to match the production company's name. Principal photography began at Prasad Film Labs on 30 April 1983, with the muhurat shot involving Chiranjeevi and Madhavi. The film was predominantly shot in the village Rebala, while the climax was taken at Porur. Principal photography was completed within three schedules over the course of 40 working days. Chiranjeevi was paid ₹, Madhavi and Kodandarami Reddy received ₹40,000 each.

Soundtrack 
The music was composed By K. Chakravarthy. All lyrics were penned by Veturi.

Release and reception 
Khaidi was released on 28 October 1983. The title of the film was considered "lucky" for Chiranjeevi, and used for two subsequent, unrelated films starring him: Khaidi No. 786 (1988) and Khaidi No. 150 (2017).

Remakes 
In 1984, Khaidi was remade in Hindi as Qaidi, and in Kannada under the same title. Madhavi reprised her role in both remakes.

References

Bibliography

External links 
 

1983 action films
1983 films
Films directed by A. Kodandarami Reddy
Films scored by K. Chakravarthy
Films with screenplays by the Paruchuri brothers
Indian action films
Indian films about revenge
Telugu films remade in other languages